Vladimir Evgenyevich Tretyakov (12 December 1936 – 8 January 2021) was a Russian mathematician. He was the rector of the Ural State University from 1993 to 2006 and was its President until his death on 8 January 2021.

References

1936 births
2021 deaths
Russian mathematicians
Corresponding Members of the Russian Academy of Sciences
Academic staff of Ural State University
Rectors of universities in Russia